Prince Jacon Osinachi Igwe (born 1991 in Aba, Nigeria), commonly known as Osinachi, is a Nigerian visual and digital artist. He is known for using Microsoft Word as his medium. Described as "Africa's foremost crypto artist," Osinachi is regarded as the first African artist to have his work digitally auctioned as an NFT by Christie's in Europe."

Career 
Osinachi entered the crypto art scene in 2017. In 2020, he held his debut solo show, Osinachi: Existence as Protest, at the Kate Vasse Galerie in Zürich, Switzerland. In 2021, Osinachi garnered attention for selling $75,000 worth of NFTs in 10 days.

Osinachi partnered with the Mohamed Amin Foundation to release NFTs for a catalogue featuring 2.5 million photographs and more than 5,000 hours of video content. The project launched $Afrofuture, an Ethereum-based social currency.

Osinachi's work has been described as "engagingly political, drawing from conversations on gender, tradition, and race." Writing about the art market in 2020, curator Jason Bailey called Osinachi "the best of what the coming generation of artists have to offer." He wrote: "Osinachi's work stands out in part because he is self-taught and creates his work using Microsoft Word, a common word processing tool few would ever think to use for making art. His signature use of color and pattern create sophisticated compositions that are dynamic, but flat like a collage, unusual for artists working digitally. His work is bold, distinct, authentic, sincere, and addresses his generation's desire for equality, diversity, and environmentalism in a way that is direct without being too on the nose."

In 2021, 1-54 and Christie's collaborated in an online auction of Osinachi's series Different Shades of Water, making him the first African NFT artist to be so featured. The series was inspired by David Hockney's 1972 painting Portrait of an Artist (Pool with Two Figures). The artworks were displayed at Somerset House.

Exhibitions 
 Osinachi: Existence as Protest at Kate Vasse Galerie, Zurich
 Different Shades of Water at Somerset House with Christie's and 1-54, London

References 

Nigerian artists
Living people
1991 births